Vesly may refer to the following communes in France:

Vesly, Eure, in the Eure département 
Vesly, Manche, in the Manche département